Qareh Quyunlu or QarAh Quyunlu or Qarah Qowyunlu or Qareh Qowyunlu, also rendered as Qaraquyunlu, may refer to:
 Qareh Quyunlu, Razavi Khorasan
 Qareh Qowyunlu, Shahin Dezh, West Azerbaijan Province 
 Qarah Quyunlu, Urmia, West Azerbaijan Province